Khandaani Shafakhana is a 2019 Indian Hindi-language comedy-drama film directed by debutante Shilpi Dasgupta, and starring Sonakshi Sinha and Badshah. The supporting cast includes Varun Sharma and Annu Kapoor. Principal photography began on 25 January 2019, and it was theatrically released in India on 2 August 2019.
It was considered as a box office disaster due to its poor commercial performance.

Plot 
Babita "Baby" Bedi, a middle class Punjabi girl, is working as a medical representative and the only earner in the house. She gets constantly shouted at by her boss and is unhappy with her job. Her uncle, who had lent them money earlier, has his eyes fixed upon Baby's house, which is the only remainder of her dead father.

One day she inherits her uncle, Mamaji's wealth after he is killed by a man. His will states that Baby is the sole heir of his property and that she has to run a fertility clinic for six months in order to sell it or else she will lose everything. She will have to face many obstacles of this society that is conservative towards women.

In order to deal with her old job, she sends Bhooshit, her brother, in place of her, claiming 6 months' sick leave. How she manages to run the clinic for the six months she has to forms the crux of the story.

Cast
 Sonakshi Sinha as Babita "Baby" Bedi
 Badshah as Gabru Ghatack
 Varun Sharma as Bhooshit Bedi
 Annu Kapoor as Tagra
 Priyansh Jora as Lemon Hero
 Kulbhushan Kharbanda as Hakim Tarachand aka Mamaji
 Rajesh Sharma as Judge Joshav Agarwal
 Nadira Babbar as Mrs. Bedi
 Rajiv Gupta as Chachaji
 Shirin Sewani as Sheetu
 Diana Penty as Sunita (special appearance in song "Shehar Ki Ladki")
Suniel Shetty (special appearance in song "Shehar Ki Ladki")
Raveena Tandon (special appearance in song "Shehar Ki Ladki")

Production
The principal photography of the film began in Punjab in the end of January 2019. The film also marks the acting debut of Badshah.

Marketing and release
The film was slated to release on 2 August 2019, after the initial release dates were changed. The film certified with a runtime of 136 minutes by British Board of Film Classification, was released on 2 August 2019.

Soundtrack

The music of the film is composed by Tanishk Bagchi, Rochak Kohli, Badshah and Payal Dev and lyrics written by Badshah, Tanishk Bagchi, Kumaar, Mellow D, Shabbir Ahmed Gautam G Sharma and Gurpreet Saini. The song "Koka" is the remake of a song of the same name sung by Jasbir Jassi. The recreated version is also sung by Jassi, co-voiced by Badshah and Dhvani Bhanushali.
The song "Shehar Ki Ladki" which is picturised on Diana Penty, is a recreated song from Rakshak (1996), originally pictured on Raveena Tandon. It was revealed that the original cast of Raveena Tandon and Suniel Shetty that featured in song sequence will appear in this song sequence to create nostalgic moments. The song was originally sung by Abhijeet Bhattacharya and Chandana Dixit and composed by Anand–Milind in 1996. Playback singer Payal Dev made her debut as a composer in the song "Dil Jaaniye".

Reception

Critical reception 
Raja Sen of The Hindustan Times wrote, "As a nation, we need to talk about sex. We're obviously having enough of it to not be scandalised this easy. It's not all shock and haww". Namrata Joshi of The Hindu wrote, "Khandaani Shafakhana may have a laudable message at its core, but gets bogged down by its own overly righteous attempt to 'educate' – that sex is not gandi baat, ashleel aur aapattijanak (bad thing, obscene and unacceptable), nothing to be shameful about." Ronak Kotecha of The Times of India wrote, "In the past, we have seen films like 'Vicky Donor' and 'Shubh Mangal Savadhan' handle sensitive subjects (read sperm donation and erectile dysfunction) with class, tact and comedy. While this film's intent is bang on, what it really needed was a heavier dose of humour and entertainment".

Box office
Khandaani Shafakhana had the opening day collection of 75 lacs and the second day collection of 80 lacs, whereas the third day collection was 1.20 crore, taking its total opening weekend collection to 27.5 million.

, with a gross of 3.27 crore in India and 0.71 crore overseas, the film has a worldwide gross collection of 39.8 million.

References

External links  
 
 
 

2010s Hindi-language films
2019 films
Films shot in Punjab, India
T-Series (company) films